Czadeczka is a river of Poland and Slovakia. With its headwaters in the Silesian Beskids near the border with Slovakia, the Czadeczka crosses the border to join the Čierňanka near Skalité. The Čierňanka joins the Kysuca at Čadca.

Rivers of Slovakia
Rivers of Poland
Rivers of Silesian Voivodeship